Badr al-Din Hilali (–1529) was a Persian poet of Turkic origin. In Herat, he was a member of the literary circle of Sultan Husayn-e Bayqara and a close associate Alisher Navai.

Works
Hilali's Divan (including his ghazals, qasidas and ruba'is)
Leyla-o-Majnun

References

15th-century Persian-language poets
16th-century Persian-language poets
People from Gorgan
1470s births
1529 deaths
Poets from the Timurid Empire
16th-century Iranian people
15th-century Iranian people